Christophe Darbellay (born 7 March 1971) in Martigny is a Swiss politician, member of Centre.  

Since 2017 he has been State Councillor in charge of the Department of Economy and Education in the Valais government.

External links

 Christophe Darbellay on the official website of the canton Valais

1971 births
Living people
Members of the National Council (Switzerland)
Christian Democratic People's Party of Switzerland politicians